Jonny Kennedy (born 16 February 1990) is a retired  rugby union player for Sale Sharks and Scotland Under 21s. He is the son of Sale Sharks owner Brian Kennedy.

Kennedy played as a centre or on the wing. He retired in May 2011 due to several concussions.

References

External links
Sale Sharks profile

Living people
1990 births
English rugby union players
Sale Sharks players
Rugby union centres
Rugby union wings